The 1978 Vancouver Whitecaps season was the fifth season of the Whitecaps, and their fifth year in the North American Soccer League and the top flight of Canadian soccer.

This was manager Tony Waiter's first full season with the club. The team was dominant in the 1978 with 68 goals scored, a thirteen-game winning streak, and a 24-6 record – tied with the dramatically higher spending powerhouse New York Cosmos for the best record in the NASL. The Whitecaps achieved this with mainly unrecognized players, nicknamed the "English Mafia" for primarily English foreign players coupled with locals including Italian-Canadians. Due to the large number of teams, 24, the season was not set up with a balanced home and away schedule with some teams played twice, others once, and still others not at all. After the league during the playoff tournament in which 16 of 24 teams competed, the Whitecaps defeated Toronto Metros-Croatia in front of 30,811 at Empire Stadium (at the time the largest crowd to see two Canadian teams play against each other) before being upset by the Portland Timbers in the quarterfinals two games to nil.

'King' Kevin Hector led the Whitecaps with 21 goals and ten assists while tying for fourth in the golden boot race.  Bob Lenarduzzi also had a strong season on the score sheet with ten goals and seventeen assists along with Bob Campbell and John Craven. Phil Parkes was the top goalkeeper in the NASL with 29 games played, a 0.95 GAA and 10 clean sheets. Alan Hinton, Steve Kember, and Bob Bolitho also were main contributors over the season. Despite the team's record and strong attendance at fifth highest in the league, the club received little recognition at the All Star Game with only Kevin Hector and John Craven named to the second team. They recouped that recognition though with Tony Waiters awarded Coach of the Year and the North American Player of the Year awarded to Bob Lenarduzzi.

Club

Roster 

The 1978 squad

Team management 
Tony Waiters' first full season as manager of Vancouver Whitecaps manager in 1978 saw the Whitecaps tied for the best record in the NASL at 24-6 and win the Coach of the Year Award.

Results

Results by round

Match results

Playoffs

See also
 History of Vancouver Whitecaps FC
 1978 North American Soccer League season

References

Vancouver Whitecaps (1974–1984) seasons
Vancouver Whitecaps
Vancouver Whitecaps
Vancouver Whitecaps